Neon the Unknown is a fictional superhero from the Golden Age of Comic Books created by Jerry Iger for Quality Comics. Neon first appeared in a story penciled and inked by Lou Fine in Hit Comics #1 and was featured on the cover. His stories ran in issues 1–17.

Like many characters owned by that company, he was later bought by DC Comics after Quality ceased operations.

Fictional character biography
Tom Corbet is a member of the Foreign Legion. While pursuing an enemy across the desert, his entire unit dies of dehydration. Surely he would have suffered the same fate if he hadn't found a magical oasis at the last second. Corbet drinks the glowing water and is transformed into Neon the Unknown, with the ability to fly and shoot energy from his hands.

According to Jess Nevins' Encyclopedia of Golden Age Superheroes, "he uses his power to kill an attacking tiger, stop a would-be world conqueror, and go on to fight crime and evil and the Germans, as well as Darmus the Wizard, the Tibetan Four Lamas, a "Batzi" scientist who drops "insanity spores" on the United States, and the scientist Fritz Cardiff and his invisibility ray".

On December 7, 1941, Neon is recruited by Uncle Sam to be a member of the Freedom Fighters, along with several other Quality Comics heroes, and defend Pearl Harbor from the Japanese attack. He, Uncle Sam, Miss America, Hourman, Invisible Hood, Magno, and Red Torpedo fight valiantly. All but Uncle Sam is seemingly killed.

As of 2008 Uncle Sam and the Freedom Fighters mini-series, Neon is revealed to be alive and has been living at his magical oasis (Magno is the only superhero who appears to have actually died in the defense of Pearl Harbor).

The new Neon 
Called upon during a major crisis hitting the reformed Freedom Fighters, Tom Corbet is confronted by Langford Terrill, the former Ray. Now warped into a more powerful glowing form but more detached from humanity, Corbet refuses his help but lets Terrill drink from his magical oasis. Adding his light-based powers to Neon's energies, Langford Terrill is now empowered as the new Neon the Unknown.

DC Rebirth
In DC Rebirth's The Unexpected, Neon the Unknown (real name Colin Nomi) is now a famous painter and a bisexual man, appearing first in Supergirl #20. Desiring more inspiration for his work, Colin performed a ritual to evoke the Fires of Creation, which resulted in him acquiring great powers to create or manipulate matter but in exchange for his vision and the lives of his friends. Colin set out on a journey of redemption as Neon the Unknown, and eventually he met up with two others on paths of redemption calling themselves Viking Judge and the Ascendant. The three of them formed The Unexpected, defenders of the Multiverse. His ability to change things - although not destroy them - is seemingly limitless, as, in the end, he even transforms the terrifying hypervampire Mandrakk the Dark Monitor into a predator who no longer feeds on life, but death, forcing him into exile in the Dark Multiverse.

Reception
In The Steranko History of Comics, historian Jim Steranko has harsh words for the strip: "The art for Neon... was extremely competent but the concepts and scripts were uninspired and threadbare".

References

External links
International Catalogue of Superheroes Entry

Golden Age superheroes
Quality Comics superheroes
Comics characters introduced in 1940
Comics characters introduced in 2018
LGBT characters in comics
Fictional bisexual males
Fictional artists
DC Comics LGBT superheroes
DC Comics characters with accelerated healing
DC Comics metahumans